Étienne-Joseph de Saint-Germain d'Apchon (1724 — )  was a French Navy officer. He served in the War of American Independence, and became a member of the Society of the Cincinnati.

Biography 
Apchon was born to a family from Forez. 

He joined the Navy as a Garde-Marine in 1740, and was promoted to Lieutenant in 1756. 

He captained the 24-gun frigate Gracieuse in the squadron under Du Chaffault for the Larache expedition in 1765. the year after, he transferred on the 32-gun frigate Pléïade.

In 1770, Apchon was promoted to Captain. The year after, he was in command of the 40-gun frigate Atalante, which he sailed to Toulon, Tunis and Malta. In 1773, he captained the 80-gun Languedoc.

In 1778, he was captain of the 74-gun Protecteur, part of the squadron under Vice-amiral d'Estaing. He took part in the Battle of St. Lucia on 15 December 1778.

In 1780, he took part in the joint French-Spanish fleet under Córdova. Later that year, he was appointed governor of Fort Lupin, a position he held until 1783. In 1783, Apchon was part in the inquiry into the events of the Battle of the Saintes.

Sources and references 
 Notes

References

 Bibliography

 
 

External links
 

French Navy officers